Samantha Ferris (born November 2, 1968) is a Canadian actress, best known for her starring role as Nina Jarvis on The 4400 and her recurring role as Ellen Harvelle on Supernatural.

Career
Ferris began her career as a radio announcer and in the mid-1990s was a television reporter for the Bellingham, Washington station KVOS-TV 12 and Vancouver's BCTV, where she went by the name Janie Ferris.

After the death of her father she decided to change careers and become an actress. She has had many starring and supporting television roles, her most notable being Sandra Cassandra on Beggars and Choosers, Nina Jarvis on The 4400, Lt. Alexa Brenner on The Evidence and Ellen Harvelle on Supernatural. Other television roles include that of deckhand Pollux in the episode "Dirty Hands" of Battlestar Galactica, as well as roles in Smallville, Stargate SG-1, The L Word, V and a series of TV movies featuring The Gourmet Detective.

Filmography

Film

Television

Video games

External links

References

1968 births
Actresses from British Columbia
Canadian film actresses
Canadian television actresses
Canadian television news anchors
Canadian video game actresses
Canadian voice actresses
Living people
People from North Vancouver
20th-century Canadian actresses
21st-century Canadian actresses
Canadian women television journalists